Badula is a small genus of 14-17 species of tropical shrubs placed formerly in the plant family Myrsinaceae (now subsumed in Primulaceae as subfamily Myrsinoideae) endemic to Madagascar and the Mascarene Islands.

Liste d'espèces 
Mascarenes endemic species:
 Badula balfouriana
 Badula barthesia
 Badula borbonica
 Badula crassa
 Badula decumbens
 Badula fragilis
 Badula grammisticta
 Badula insularis
 Badula multiflora
 Badula nitida
 Badula ovalifolia
 Badula platyphylla
 Badula reticulata
 Badula richardiana

Madagascar endemic species:
 Badula leandriana
 Badula sieberi
 Badula pervilleana

Chemistry
Badula multiflora A.DC. has been found to possess antioxidant properties.

References

 
Primulaceae genera
Taxonomy articles created by Polbot